The 2019 National Premier Leagues Grand Final was the sixth National Premier Leagues Victoria Grand Final, the championship deciding match of the National Premier Leagues Victoria in Australia. It was played on 15 September 2019 at AAMI Park in Melbourne between Avondale and Bentleigh Greens. Bentleigh won on penalties to secure their second National Premier Leagues Victoria title.

Match

Details

Broadcasting
The Grand Final was broadcast live through Australia on Facebook Live and YouTube.

See also
 2019 Football Federation Victoria season
 National Premier Leagues Victoria

References

External links
 Official Website

2019 National Premier Leagues season
Soccer in Victoria (Australia)